The International Basketball Association (IBA) was founded in 1995 by a group of businessmen led by Tom Anderson. The original owners of franchises in the league were George Daniel (Black Hills Posse-Rapid City, SD), John Korsmo, Al Gardner, and Al Hovland (Fargo Beez), Jeff McCarron (St. Cloud Rock 'n Rollers), Bill Sorensen (Dakota Wizards - Bismarck) and Earl Barish (Winnipeg Cyclones). Earl Barish of Winnipeg directed the IBA as League President and the league eventually grew to ten franchises. In the fall of 2001, CBA and IBL teams merged with the IBA and purchased the assets of the defunct CBA, including its name, logo and records from the bankruptcy court and restarted operations, calling itself the CBA. This group continued to operate until June 2009, when it was forced to cease operations.

Teams

League championships

The IBA merged with the International Basketball League and the Continental Basketball Association (CBA) to "restart" the CBA for the 2001–2002 season.

Awards

Most Valuable Player
1995–96 – Isaac Burton (Black Hills Posse)
1996–97 – Dennis Edwards (Black Hills Posse)
1997–98 – Andrell Hoard (Winnipeg Cyclone) and Mike Lloyd (Mansfield Hawks)
1998–99 – Andrell Hoard (Winnipeg Cyclone) and Mike Lloyd (Mansfield Hawks)
1999–00 – Brian Green (Dakota Wizards)
2000–01 – Lonnie Cooper (Des Moines Dragons)

Rookie of the Year
1997–98 – Kenya Capers (St. Paul Slam!)
1998–99 – Roderick Blakney (Dakota Wizards)
1999–00 – Antonio Reynolds-Dean (Dakota Wizards)
2000–01 – Marcus Hicks (Siouxland Bombers)

Defensive Player of the Year
1997–98 – Ron Bayless (Des Moines Dragons)
1998–99 – Roderick Blakney (Dakota Wizards)
1999–00 – Johnny McCrimmon (Fargo-Moorhead Beez)
2000–01 – Willie Murdaugh (Dakota Wizards)

Sixth Man of the Year
1997–98 – Damon Jones (Black Hills Posse)
1998–99 – Rob Feaster (Rochester Skeeters)
1999–00 – Kevin Beard (Dakota Wizards)
2000–01 – Rasheed Brokenborough (South Dakota Gold)

Coach of the Year
1995–96 – Duane Ticknor (Black Hills Posse)
1996–97 – Duane Ticknor (Black Hills Posse)
1997–98 – Duane Ticknor (Black Hills Posse)
1998–99 – Darryl Dawkins (Winnipeg Cyclone) and Kevin Mackey (Mansfield Hawks)
1999–00 – Duane Ticknor (Dakota Wizards)
2000–01 – Dave Joerger (Dakota Wizards) and Mike Born (Des Moines Dragons)

Statistical leaders

Notable players
These players played at least 1 game in the NBA.
Chris Andersen
Nate Driggers
Damon Jones
Garth Joseph
Martin Lewis
Anthony Taylor
Ime Udoka

See also
Continental Basketball Association
International Basketball League (1999–2001)
United States Basketball League

References

External links
 International Basketball Association History at Association for Professional Basketball Research

Defunct basketball leagues in the United States
 
Sports leagues established in 1995
Basketball leagues in Canada